Devour is a 2005 American horror film directed by David Winkler.

Plot
The story follows Jake Gray (Jensen Ackles), a young man who's been having bizarre visions of murder and self-mutilation, and his experience with a live roleplay-like online game called "The Pathway" (a similar roleplaying as seen in The Game).

Following the deaths of his friends Conrad (Teach Grant) and Dakota (Dominique Swain), who introduced him to the game, Jake soon learns that "The Pathway" is actually being run by a man named Aiden Kater (Martin Cummins) and his band of Devil-worshippers. They've been using it to look for a specific person, even as they manipulate others into killing. As their final acts, the victims of "The Pathway" commit suicide in various gruesome ways.

With help from Marisol (Shannyn Sossamon), a new friend who dabbles in the mystic occult, Jake learns from a man called Ivan Reisz (William Sadler) that his wife, Anne Kilton, and their unborn child were taken by Kater and sacrificed to the devil. Soon after, he tracks down Kater and learns that Anne was not in fact sacrificed to the devil, that she gave birth, and that her child was stolen by mortals, and raised as a human. He is that child, the person whom "The Pathway" was created to find, and Anne is really Satan (devil) herself.

Ultimately, Jake confronts his birth mother (who has killed his adoptive parents) in the very place where he was stolen from her, he then learns that Marisol was, in fact, Satan/Anne. Following his rejection and attempted murder of her, Jake is shown a vision of the night he was born. He awakens covered with blood on the ground the next day, only to be arrested for the murder of his parents. The movie ends with Jake wondering if everything (including Pathway itself) really was not created by his imagination and if he had committed all those murders.

Cast
Jensen Ackles as Jake Gray
Shannyn Sossamon as Marisol
Dominique Swain as Dakota
William Sadler as Ivan Reisz
Teach Grant as Conrad Dean
Martin Cummins as Aiden Kater
Rob Stewart as Ross North
R. Nelson Brown as Walt
Wanda Cannon as Kathy Gray
Jenn Griffin as Older Anne Kilton
Alan Ackles as Paul Kilton
Rob Allen as Young Paul
Tami DeSchutter as Young Kathy
John Innes as Father Moore
Reg Tupper as Hartney

Reception
Critical reception for Devour has been overwhelmingly negative. It holds an approval rating of 20% on Rotten Tomatoes, based on five reviews with an average score of 3.7/10.

References

External links
 

2005 direct-to-video films
2005 horror films
2005 films
Films about self-harm
The Devil in film
Original Film films
Films produced by Neal H. Moritz
Sony Pictures direct-to-video films
Films directed by David Winkler
2000s English-language films